Clypeococcum is a genus of lichenicolous fungi belonging to the family Polycoccaceae.

Species

Clypeococcum amylaceum 
Clypeococcum bisporum 
Clypeococcum cajasense 
Clypeococcum cetrariae 
Clypeococcum cladonema 
Clypeococcum epicrassum 
Clypeococcum epimelanostolum 
Clypeococcum galloides 
Clypeococcum grossum 
Clypeococcum hemiamyloideum 
Clypeococcum hypocenomycis 
Clypeococcum lenae 
Clypeococcum placopsiiphilum 
Clypeococcum rugosisporum

References

Trypetheliales
Dothideomycetes genera
Taxa described in 1977
Taxa named by David Leslie Hawksworth
Lichenicolous fungi